Syd Tims (12 November 1914 – 30 May 1962) was an  Australian rules footballer who played with South Melbourne in the Victorian Football League (VFL).

Notes

External links 

1914 births
1962 deaths
Australian rules footballers from Victoria (Australia)
Sydney Swans players
Port Melbourne Football Club players